Saukampen is a mountain in Nord-Fron Municipality in Innlandet county, Norway.

See also
List of mountains of Norway by height

References

Nord-Fron
Mountains of Innlandet